All phone numbers in Morocco are 9 digits in length (excluding the leading 0).

Morocco uses a closed numbering plan, i.e. the prefix is not omitted for local calls. This is necessary because the same geographic area can be served by several prefixes. Casablanca, for instance, has 10 prefixes.

Fixed and mobile prefixes belong exclusively to one phone company. On the following list, fixed networks are indicated by the following letters:
I = Maroc Telecom (fixed), O = Orange Maroc (NGN), W = INWI (Maroc Connect) (fixed NGN), X = INWI (Maroc Connect) (fixed GSM(?))

List 
The disputed territory of Western Sahara de facto uses the ranges owned by Morocco. The ranges in Western Sahara are +212 5288-XXXXX, and +212 5289-XXXXX.

History

1990 - Transition to 6-digit numbers
In 1990, 6-digit phone numbers were introduced.

199x - Transition from 6-digit to 7-digit numbers

2000 - Transition from 7-digit to 8-digit numbers
On 2000-10-13 at 23:00 UTC, the numbering area in Morocco was split into 5 parts by adding another digit to all area codes in Morocco.

2006 - Merger of 04 into 02 and 05 into 03
Six years later (2006-03-24 23:00 UTC), part of this split was reverted in order to make room for cellular networks. The 04 numbering area was merged into 02 and 05 was merged into 03, which caused 02 to cover the South while 03 covered the North. This could be done easily because there were no conflicts.

2009 - Transition from 8-digit to 9-digit numbers
On 2009-03-07 at 02:00 UTC, phone numbers in Morocco got another additional digit. A 5 was prepended to all fixed numbers while a 6 was prepended to mobile numbers. The 08 numbers became 080 and 09 became 089.

External links
 Liste des préfixes des opérateurs de téléphonie Mobile et Fixe au Maroc
 Official Numbering Plan of Morocco (incomplete)
 World Telephone numbering Guide (outdated)
 Plan de numérotation - Agence National de Règlemantation des Télécommunications (French and Arabic) 

 ITU allocations list

Morocco
Telecommunications in Morocco
Telephone numbers